Khana Khazana was an Indian Hindi-language cookery show hosted by Indian chef, Sanjeev Kapoor. The show was primarily based upon Indian cuisine.

The show was directed by Hansal Mehta.

The first episode of the show was hosted by Harpal Singh Sokhi. The subsequent episodes were hosted by Sanjeev Kapoor. Occasionally, Chef Kapoor brought in various celebrity guests and viewer recipes are also displayed. Over the course of the show, Chef Kapoor had become more conscious and concerned about food-related diseases and cooked low-fat and healthy meals.

References

Indian cooking television series
Zee TV original programming
1993 Indian television series debuts
2000s Indian television series
2012 Indian television series endings